Togari may refer to:

 Togari (bean), a name for the pigeon pea (Cajanus cajan) in Kannada, India
 Togari (manga), a manga series written and illustrated by Yoshinori Natsume
 Sony Xperia Z Ultra, development codename Togari
 Togari (Japan), a place in the city of Chino, Nagano Prefecture
 Togari, Tasmania, a suburb within the Circular Head Council